Ardhangini Ek Ardhsatya is a 2016 Hindi film produced and directed by Reema Mukherjee. The film is based on Rabindranath Tagore's classic 1916 novel The Home and the World. It is set against backdrop of the freedom movement. The film stars Subodh Bhave, Sreelekha Mitra, Subrat Dutta, Manoj Mitra, Reema Lagoo, Varsha Usgaonkar.

Cast 
Subodh Bhave
Sreelekha Mitra
Subrat Dutt
Manoj Mitra
Reema Lagoo
Varsha Usgaonkar.
Arjun Rajput

References

External links 

Ardhangini Ek Ardhsatya on Twitter
Ardhangini Ek Ardhsatya on Facebook

2016 films
2010s Hindi-language films
Films based on works by Rabindranath Tagore